Sokrutovka is a rural locality (a selo) and the administrative center of Sokrutovsky Selsoviet of Akhtubinsky District, Astrakhan Oblast, Russia. The population was 826 as of 2010. There are 22 streets.

Geography 
Sokrutovka is located 65 km southeast of Akhtubinsk (the district's administrative centre) by road. Pirogovka is the nearest rural locality.

References 

Rural localities in Akhtubinsky District